Luciana Mello (born January 22, 1979) is a Brazilian singer and professional dancer.

Mello began her musical training early in life, taking voice and dance lessons. As a child, she sang in choirs and later performed in musicals. She emerged on the Brazilian pop music scene as a participant in the Artistas Reunidos (Reunited Artists) project, and issued her first solo CD, Assim Que Se Faz, in 2001.

Mello's father was prominent Brazilian musician and singer Jair Rodrigues. Her brother, Jair Oliveira, is also an influential producer of modern Brazilian pop music and is a singer/songwriter in his own right.

Her album Na Luz do Samba was nominated for the 2017 Latin Grammy Award for Best Samba/Pagode Album.

Discography 

Other Albums
 1998:Projeto Artistas Reunidos

References

External links 
 

1979 births
Living people
Brazilian pop singers
Música Popular Brasileira singers
Samba musicians
Singers from São Paulo
21st-century Brazilian singers
21st-century Brazilian women singers